John Houshmand (born 1954) is an American furniture maker, sculptor, musician, and contractor. He has an atelier in New York's Catskill Mountains. He has been described as a contemporary designer who uses "massive upended split logs" in the style of George Nakashima.

Biography 
John Houshmand was born to a Dutch-American mother and an Iranian father. He attended Yale University and received a BA degree in 1978.

Houshmand's designs "often juxtapose massive chunks of wood with thick glass panes" and are made by his staff on a  farm that is "also home to the company sawmill and the 1,700 slabs he keeps on hand for inspiration." He has a showroom in Manhattan and travels to meet clients for custom orders on tables that can cost about $12,000 USD in 2009. He "has been a photographer, a musician, and a partner in high-end residential construction" and now makes "one-of-a-kind sculptural furniture out of planks, slabs, and even trunks of reclaimed American hardwood like black walnut and elm."

He bought the remote ranch property for $300,000 in 1991.

Discography 
 Live @ Here, Audio Artists (1997)
 Beat Noir, Patrick Noonan (1996)
 Void of Course, John Houshmand & Ten Martian Boys (1994)
 Undiscovered Country, Laurasia (1988)
 East River Consort, Laurasia (1978)
 Noonan, Levi & Houshmand, Laurasia (1975)

References

Further reading
Kim, Sheila John Houshmand.(market) February 1, 2004 Interior Design

External links
 John Houshmand website

American cabinetmakers
Living people
1954 births
American sculptors
American furniture makers
American furniture designers
American people of Iranian descent
Yale University alumni